Yarikta (Yarigta) is a rural locality (an ulus) in Barguzinsky District, Republic of Buryatia, Russia. The population was 172 as of 2010. There are 2 streets.

Geography 
Yarikta is located at the feet of the Barguzin Range, 43 km northeast of Barguzin (the district's administrative centre) by road. Ulyukchikan is the nearest rural locality.

See also
The Most Beautiful Villages in Russia

References 

Rural localities in Barguzinsky District